The 2017 Bendigo Women's International was a professional tennis tournament played on outdoor hard courts. It was the eleventh edition of the tournament and was part of the 2017 ITF Women's Circuit. It took place in Bendigo, Australia, on 6–12 November 2017.

Singles main draw entrants

Seeds 

 1 Rankings as of 30 October 2017.

Other entrants 
The following players received entry from the qualifying draw:
  Genevieve Lorbergs
  Ivana Popovic
  Ramu Ueda
  Marianna Zakarlyuk

Champions

Singles

 Tamara Zidanšek def.  Olivia Rogowska, 5–7, 6–1, 6–0

Doubles
 
 Alison Bai /  Zoe Hives def.  Asia Muhammad /  Arina Rodionova, 4–6, 6–4, [10–8]

External links 
 2017 Bendigo Women's International at ITFtennis.com
 Official website

2017 ITF Women's Circuit
2017 in Australian tennis
Bendigo Women's International
2017 in Australian women's sport